Mahakali is the Hindu goddess of destruction and doomsday.

Mahakali may also refer to:

Arts, entertainment and media
 Mahakali (album), a 2008 album by Jarboe.
 Mahakali — Anth Hi Aarambh Hai, an Indian television series that premiered in 2017.

Places
 Mahakali, Baitadi, a village in the Baitadi District of western Nepal.
 Mahakali, Darchula, a municipality in Darchula District of Sudurpashchim province in Nepal.
 Mahakali, Kanchanpur, a municipality in the Kanchanpur District of Sudurpashchim Province in Nepal.
 Mahakali, Nuwakot, a village in the Bagmati Province of central Nepal. 
 Mahakali Caves, a group of rock-cut monuments located in Andheri, an eastern suburb of Mumbai, India.
 Mahakali River, also called Sharda River, a river in Uttarakhand, India. 
 Mahakali Zone, a former division of Nepal, now part of Sudurpashchim Province.

See also
 Kali (disambiguation)